Suleika Jaouad is an American writer, advocate, and motivational speaker. She is the author of the "Life, Interrupted" column in The New York Times and has also written for Vogue, Glamour, NPR's All Things Considered and Women's Health. Her 2021 memoir Between Two Kingdoms was a New York Times Best Seller.

When Jaouad was diagnosed with a rare form of acute myeloid leukemia in 2011, doctors said she had only a 35% chance of surviving. She survived and has written and spoken extensively about her medical experiences. Her Emmy Award-winning column, "Life, Interrupted" was part of the New York Times Well blog. In December 2021, Jaouad announced her cancer had returned and that she had undergone a second bone marrow transplant.

Personal life
Jaouad was born in New York City to a Tunisian father and a Swiss mother. Her father Hédi taught French at Skidmore College in Saratoga Springs, New York. Her mother Anne was an artist. She attended the Juilliard School's pre-college program, where she studied the double bass.

She graduated from Princeton University in 2010, and earned an MFA from Bennington College in writing and literature. Jaouad travels around the U.S. teaching writing and wellness workshops and she speaks at high schools, universities, hospitals, corporations, fund-raisers and professional events. Jaouad has been featured on NPR's Talk of the Nation, NBC's Weekend Today, CBS News, The Paris Review, the Los Angeles Times and Darling magazine, among others. Her TED Talk titled "What almost dying taught me about living" was released in June 2019.

Jaouad is married to musician Jon Batiste, with whom she has been in a relationship since 2014. According to a 2012 New York Times wellness article, Life, Interrupted, which she chronicled her experiences as a young adult with cancer on a weekly basis, Jaouad wrote she first met Batiste as a teenager in band camp. In April 2022, the couple revealed in a television interview that they had been secretly married in February 2022.

Between Two Kingdoms

Between Two Kingdoms: A Memoir of a Life Interrupted is a memoir published in 2021 by Random House that discusses her cancer diagnosis, treatment, and recovery. The title of the book comes from a line in Susan Sontag's Illness as Metaphor: "Everyone who is born holds dual citizenship in the kingdom of the well and in the kingdom of the sick."

In the book, Jaouad revisits her life before and after her cancer diagnosis "to forge a path forward after remission. Drawing on journals, medical records, letters, e-mails and interviews with many of those who appear across its pages, Jaouad's memoir details her early symptoms, initial diagnosis and then, in great detail, the physical, mental and emotional toll cancer takes on her and those around her."

The book was generally well received by critics, including starred reviews from Booklist, Library Journal, and Publishers Weekly.

Writing for Library Journal, Barrie Olmstead wrote, "Jaouad does a beautiful job of writing from this place of 'dual citizenship,' where she finds pain but also joy, kinship, and possibility." Publishers Weekly called the book "a stunning memoir, well-crafted and hard to put down," while Booklist's June Sawyer said it was "[b]oldly candid and truly memorable."

Between Two Kingdoms also received positive reviews from Kirkus Reviews, Los Angeles Times, NPR, and Shelf Awareness. Kirkus Reviews called the book "[m]emorable, lyrical, and ultimately hopeful: a book that speaks intently to anyone who suffers from illness and loss." According to NPR Heller McAlpin, "Jaouad's book stands out not only because she has lived to parse the saga of her medical battle with the benefit of hindsight, but also because it encompasses the less familiar tale of what it's like to survive and have to figure out how to live again." Shelf Awareness explained, Though heavy, Jaouad's story is steeped in a wry optimism. This is in part because readers know Jaouad will survive to write this book, but it is also a testament to what makes Between Two Kingdoms so compelling: Jaouad's uncanny ability to reach into her pain and turn it into something else. She does not deny or gloss over the challenges of her diagnosis or the gut-wrenching torture of some of her treatments, yet she reckons with ways these impossible years of her life forged her into the woman she has since become.The Los Angeles Times also commended Jaouad's honesty, saying it's the key to the book.

Booklist also provided a positive review for the audiobook, noting, "Jaouad, reading her own work, is a sympathetic and appealing narrator. Although she tells a difficult and painful story, her thoughtful tone never wavers toward anger or bitterness. Instead, she describes difficult subjects patiently, only adding emphasis to conversations to convey the truly fraught nature of their subjects."

Awards

References

External links 
 

21st-century American journalists
21st-century American memoirists
American health and wellness writers
The New York Times columnists
American women columnists
American journalists of Arab descent
Writers from New York City
Emmy Award winners
Princeton University alumni
American people of Tunisian descent
American people of Swiss descent
21st-century American women
1980s births
Living people
Bennington College alumni